The boxing tournament at the 1951 Mediterranean Games was held in Alexandria, Egypt.

Although ten nations took part in the inaugural Mediterranean Games multi-sports event, only four of them (Egypt, Italy, Syria, Lebanon) entered athletes for the boxing tournament, which consisted of ten weight divisions.

All the final bouts took place at the Grand Salle of the Stade Fouad 1er (present-day Alexandria Stadium), the oldest and the largest stadium in Africa at the time which also hosted the opening ceremony of the Games on 5 October.

As Mediterranean Games were meant to be an event providing an opportunity for athletes to practice in the year before the Olympics, a number of medalists from Alexandria had either competed for their countries at the 1948 Summer Olympics in London, or later went on to appear at the 1952 Summer Olympics in Helsinki nine months later:

Egypt
Ali Zaki competed in the –62 kg in 1948
Gharib Afifi competed in the –71 kg event in 1948
Moustafa Fahim competed in the –73 kg event in 1948 and in 1952
Mohamed El-Minabawi competed in the –81 kg event in 1948 and in 1952
Fathi Abdel Rahman competed in the –67 kg event in 1952
Ibrahim Abdrabbou competed in the –54 kg event in 1952
Mohi Hamaky competed in the –60 kg event in 1952
Ahmed El-Minabawi competed in the +81 kg event in 1952

Italy
Giacomo Di Segni competed in the –81 kg event in 1948 and +81 kg event in 1952
Gianbattista Alfonsetti competed in the –81 kg event in 1952
Aristide Pozzali competed in the –51 kg event in 1952
Walter Sentimenti competed in the –75 kg event in 1952
Bruno Visintin competed in the –63.5 kg event in 1952

Lebanon
Sarkis Moussa competed in the –63.5 kg event in 1952

Medalists

Medal table

Note 1: Official 1951 Mediterranean Games report erroneously lists silver-winning Veniero Innocenti (ITA) as Egyptian
Note 2: Official report erroneously classifies –57 kg results as –60 kg category and –60 kg results as –63.5 kg
Note 3: Official report is missing all three medalists in the –63.5 kg category (Zaki, Zakairi, Moussa), listing only 9 out of 10 weight divisions

References
1951 Mediterranean Games report at the International Committee of Mediterranean Games (CIJM) website
1951 Mediterranean Games boxing tournament at Amateur Boxing Results
List of Olympians who won medals at the Mediterranean Games at Olympedia.org

Medi
Boxing
1951